Hans Riemer may refer to:
Hans Riemer (Austrian politician)
Hans Riemer (Maryland politician)